Elachista olgae is a moth in the family Elachistidae. It was described by Sinev in 1992. It is found in Russia.

References

Moths described in 1992
olgae
Moths of Asia